Digital Mars is a small American software company owned by Walter Bright and based in Vienna, Virginia, that makes C, C++ and D compilers, and associated utilities such as an integrated development environment (IDE) for Windows and DOS, which Digital Mars terms an integrated development and debugging environment (IDDE). They also distribute the compilers for free on their web site.

Over time, the names of these products have changed. The C compiler was first named Datalight C compiler, then Zorland C, then Zortech C, and now [since when?] Digital Mars C/C++ compiler. The C++ compiler was first named Zortech C++ (the first commercial C++ compiler for Windows), then Symantec C++, and now Digital Mars C++ (DMC++).

The company has gained notice in the software development community for the D programming language, which was developed in-house and a result of Bright's frustration with the direction of the C++ language and his experience implementing it.

In 2002, Digital Mars released DMDScript, an ECMA-262-compliant JavaScript engine, written in the D language.

History
In 1988 Zortech C++ was the first C++ compiler to ship for Windows and the performance of its compiled executables compared favourably against Microsoft C 5.1 and Watcom C 6.5 in a graphics benchmark run by PC Magazine.  Stanley B. Lippman described how Zortech C++ was the first compiler to implement return value optimization, a now obligatory optimization for any C++ compiler.

References

External links
 

C (programming language) compilers
C++ compilers